The 1989 Louisiana Tech Bulldogs football team was an American football team that represented Louisiana Tech University as an I-A independent during the 1989 NCAA Division I-A football season. In their second year under head coach Joe Raymond Peace, the team compiled an 5–4–1 record.

Schedule

References

Louisiana Tech Bulldogs
Louisiana Tech Bulldogs football seasons
Louisiana Tech Bulldogs football